Dichomeris ventriprojecta is a moth in the family Gelechiidae. It was described by Hou-Hun Li, Hui Zhen and Wolfram Mey in 2013. It is found in Namibia.

The wingspan is 16-16.5 mm. The forewings are greyish yellow with scattered brown scales. The costal margin is dark brown basally, with dark brown dots on the distal one-fourth. There are dark brown spots at one-third, two-thirds and near the end of the cell, as well as a dark brown streak from the end of the cell to the end of the fold. There are also dark brown dots on the termen. The hindwings are grey.

Etymology
The species name refers to the triangular process of the right lobe of sicae and is derived from Latin ventr- (meaning ventral) and projectus (meaning process).

References

Moths described in 2013
ventriprojecta